Jong Ok-myong (born 5 June 1979) is a North Korean short track speed skater. She competed in three events at the 1998 Winter Olympics.

References

1979 births
Living people
North Korean female short track speed skaters
Olympic short track speed skaters of North Korea
Short track speed skaters at the 1998 Winter Olympics
Place of birth missing (living people)
Asian Games medalists in short track speed skating
Short track speed skaters at the 2003 Asian Winter Games
Medalists at the 2003 Asian Winter Games
Asian Games silver medalists for North Korea
20th-century North Korean women